Katarzyna Pełczyńska-Nałęcz (born October 26, 1970) is a Polish sociologist and the former Ambassador of Poland to Russia. She succeeded Wojciech Zajączkowski in the fall of 2014. She became the first woman ambassador of Poland in Moscow since the establishment of Polish–Russian relations between the Kingdom of Poland and the Grand Duchy of Moscow in the 16th century. Pełczyńska-Nałęcz previously served as Undersecretary of State at the Polish Foreign Ministry.

Life
Pełczyńska-Nałęcz graduated from the Institute of Sociology of Warsaw University in 1994. Then she worked at the Institute of Philosophy and Sociology of the Polish Academy of Sciences where in 1999 she defended her Ph.D. Later she became the deputy director at the Center for Eastern Studies and the head of its Russian Department.

In an interview to a Russian news agency, Pełczyńska-Nałęcz said the return of the wreck of the Polish presidential plane which crashed in 2010 would be "of symbolic significance for Poland".

Pełczyńska-Nałęcz speaks English and Russian. She is married and has three children.

References

1970 births
Living people
Ambassadors of Poland to Russia
Politicians from Warsaw
Polish women academics
University of Warsaw alumni
Polish women ambassadors
Academic staff of the Polish Academy of Sciences